The Sydney Football Stadium, known commercially as Allianz Stadium, is a football stadium in Moore Park, Sydney, Australia. Built as a replacement for the original Sydney Football Stadium, it was officially opened on 28 August 2022. The ground's major tenants are the Sydney Roosters of the National Rugby League, the New South Wales Waratahs of the Super Rugby, and Sydney FC of the A-League Men. It will be used as one of the venues for the 2023 FIFA Women's World Cup, 2027 Rugby World Cup and a regional venue for the 2032 Summer Olympics.

History
In October 2018 plans for the new stadium to replace the original Sydney Football Stadium were released by the Government of New South Wales. In December 2018 Lendlease were appointed to build the stadium. Construction was initially scheduled to commence in 2019 with an early 2022 completion date. In July 2019 the construction part of the Lendlease contract was cancelled by the government with John Holland and Multiplex shortlisted to bid for the contract. In December 2019 John Holland was awarded a $735 million construction contract, representing a $99 million increase in the original budget for demolition and construction. The stadium was completed and opened on 28 August 2022. The total construction cost of this stadium was A$828 million. Guy Sebastian performed on the opening night on 28 August 2022 after a free community open day. Critically acclaimed Grammy winning singer-songwriter Bruno Mars performed 2 exclusive concerts  on 14 and 15 October 2022. Pop icon and Grammy-winning singer-songwriter Sir Elton John performed two historic shows on his Farewell Yellow Brick Road global farewell tour in Allianz Stadium on 17 and 18 January 2023.

Construction
Demolition of the previous stadium began on 8 March 2019. Opposition from local interest groups saw them attempt to prevent or slow the demolition via legal action before the 2019 New South Wales state election. After a short court-ordered delay just prior to the election, the existing Government was returned and the demolition of the old stadium continued through to completion on 18 December 2019 at a cost of $40 million.

Construction of the stadium commenced on 15 April 2020 by construction giant John Holland Group, with major piling and excavation works beginning the following month. By the end of 2020 work on the structure had commenced on all four sides of the new venue, which included the main lift cores and precast placement works which would make up the main seating area. Following this the main formwork contractors commenced to allow the slabs to be poured for the main back of house areas. The first seats were installed on 27 October 2021.

Additional facilities and membership
Colocated with the Stadium but constructed under a separate contract is the Sporting Club of Sydney. This is a premium gym and wellness centre including gymnasiums, squash courts, pools, sauna and spas.

Various memberships are available that provide access to the SCG, Allianz Stadium and the fitness and lifestyle facilities. SCG Members do not have access to Allianz Stadium nor the fitness and lifestyle facilities.

Members have access to dedicated seating, bars and restaurants within the stadium.

Various Tenant Clubs also offer membership to their home games at the stadium. These seats are generally in public areas other than Tunnel and Clubhouse memberships offered by Sydney FC.

Political and contractual issues
The demolition and rebuild of the stadium was a major political issue for the 2019 New South Wales state election. Sydney journalist, Peter FitzSimons, published articles opposing the build. The state Labor party, which was in Opposition, elected to oppose the rebuild as their official policy. The election was won by the then-incumbent government and the Sydney Football Stadium rebuild continued post-election.

In December 2018, Lendlease was unveiled as the successful bidder to carry out the demolition and construction work. At the time, then-Minister for Sport Stuart Ayres MP was quizzed over how the contract for construction could be awarded, because development consent had not been secured for stage two.

On 26 July 2019, John Sidoti, then-Minister for Sport, Multiculturalism, Seniors and Veterans, announced Lendlease would not be constructing the new stadium because it was unable to complete the A$729 million project within budget. At this stage demolition was mostly complete and it appeared the original contract was a fixed price option for the construction phase. John Holland took over the project after Lendlease declined to continue.

Rugby Australia Building
Rugby Australia's headquarters are located at the north end of the stadium precinct, in the Rugby Australia Building. It also holds offices of the Wallabies, Wallaroos and the Australia women's national rugby sevens team. The building is operated in partnership with University of Technology Sydney.

Rugby League Central
The National Rugby League's headquarters, Rugby League Central, is based in the stadium precinct. This includes the state-of-the-art 'NRL Bunker' television officiating centre.

Crowd records
Current as of 14 November 2022

Home town rivalry
The home ground advantage is the latest subject of two major NRL rivals, with both laying claim to using Alliaz Stadium as their home ground. 
The current home team is the Sydney Roosters, however, the NRL are currently trying to move the South Sydney Rabbitohs back to their former home at Moore Park. Traditionally, this ground was regarded as their original home ground having played there from 1908 until 1948, before relocating to Redfern Oval. South Sydney left Redfern Oval, and returned to the stadium in the mid-1980s, staying until 2005 when they departed for Sydney Olympic Park. South Sydney have signed a one-year deal to remain at Accor Stadium for the 2023 NRL season, after which it is widely anticipated the club will move to Allianz.

References

Multi-purpose stadiums in Australia
Philip Cox buildings
Sports venues in Sydney
A-League Men stadiums
Rugby league stadiums in Australia
Rugby union stadiums in Australia
Soccer venues in Sydney
2023 FIFA Women's World Cup stadiums
New South Wales Waratahs
Sydney FC
Sydney Roosters
Moore Park, New South Wales
Venues of the 2032 Summer Olympics and Paralympics